Prayatna means – effort or activity; it expresses a sense of human determination and initiative but is required to be supplemented by confidence in one’s own abilities and steadfastness of purpose which two factors combine to make it a driving force. Prayatna does not merely mean 'effort' but 'effort at a point of articulation'.

Meaning

Prayatna (Sanskrit: प्रयत्नः) means – 'effort', 'exertion', 'endeavour', 'perseverance', 'activity' or 'action in general'. Pāṇini explains that prayatna does not merely mean effort but effort at a point of articulation; it expresses a sense of human determination and initiative and needs to be supplemented by confidence in one’s own abilities and steadfastness of purpose which makes prayatna a driving force.

Implication

Prayatna implies energy (vīrya)  and  enthusiasm (utsaha) directed towards strenuous efforts (anusthāna) for attaining the state of equipoise (sthiti) in undisturbed calm  (praśānta-vāhitā) under the influence of sattva-guna. It is a part of energetic and enthusiastic pursuit abhyāsa, and an act (kriti) prompted by the desire or will (icchā) that involves  physical exertion (cheśțā) Actions are of two kinds – i) vital actions prompted by life (jīvana-pūrvaka), and ii) voluntary actions initiated by desire and aversion (icchā-dveśa-pūrvaka). Vital actions are non-voluntary produced by the conjunction of the self with the internal organ which depends on the self, and all voluntary actions are produced by desire and aversion that produce merits and demerits. Empirical pleasure   arises from the fulfilment of these actions but transcendental bliss arises from their extermination. Prayatna ('volition') finds its fullest expression within intentional action.

According to the Vaisesika school of Mimamsa thought, karma is movement or action in which there is no effect to differentiate an intentional action from an unintentional one; karma excludes all kinds of mental acts, and prayatna in itself is not a karma but a quality of the self that shares a common violational trait with sankalpa ('chosen resolution'). Prayatna ('effort') is one of the five avasthās ('stages of action') viz., the second stage, the other four being ārambha ('the beginning'), prāptayāśā ('prospect of success'), niyatāpti ('certainty of success') and phalagāma or phalayoga ('attainment of result'). Karya ('action') consists of one of the three objects of human existence. Prayatna ('effort') is exertion attended with great haste, when result has not been obtained. Uneven progress indicates uneven stages.

Pāṇīniya-śikśā states that in Indian phonetics, sounds are distinguished from each other on the basis of swaras ('accents'), kāla ('time or duration'), sthāna ('point of articulation'), prayatna ('manner') and 'anupradāna' ('type of phonation'), where prayatna, here meaning 'manner', refers to how the physical organ called kāraṇa ('articulator') relates to the point of articulation, sparśa ('contact'), 'upasamhara' ('approximation'), vivarta ('open') etc. Sukta I.i.9 reads – 
तुल्यास्यप्रयत्नं सवर्णम् | 
meaning – "those whose place of utterance and effort are equal are called savarṇa or homogenous letters" i.e. when the sthāna ('place of utterance') and prayatna ('effort') are the same; the inner effort is called abhyantara (which are of four kinds), and external called bhaya.

According to the Nyaya School there are three groups of prayatna – pravrtti, nivrtti and jivanaprayatna, the former two are citta vrttis, the third being efforts made by individuals to maintain life; in Yoga philosophy, prayatna means - the effort of breathing which in the practice of āsanas must be smooth and regular, and prayatna śaithilya means the exact and even weighing of effort and effortlessness; śaithilya means laxity, and this state is experienced when the pinnacle of intelligence holds the body on its own, unaided and effortlessly.

Significance

Kriya ('action') is the nature of prayatna or personal effort, and there can be no effort without a body; prayatna is a quality which emerges in the embodied self and is associated with manas ('mind'). Caraka Sutras list the guṇas beginning with para ('universality') and ending with prayatna ('effort') together with sartha ('sense-qualities') in which list buddhi does not figure but is separately enumerated. Prayatna is conscious activity, which in-coordination with desire, antipathy, pleasure, pain and knowledge indicates the existence of the self.

References

Vedanta
Sanskrit grammar
Vedas
Yoga concepts
Sanskrit words and phrases